St John's GAA may refer to:

St John's GAA (Antrim), a sports club in Belfast
St John's GAA (Cork), a sports club in Aubane, Kilcorney and Mushera, Ireland
St John's GAA (Down) a sports club
St John's GAA (Sligo), a sports club in Carraroe, Ireland

See also
 Ballinteer St John's GAA, a sports club in Dún Laoghaire–Rathdown, Ireland